Cassity Fork is a stream in the U.S. state of West Virginia.

Cassity Fork was named in honor of one Mr. Cassidy, a pioneer settler.

See also
List of rivers of West Virginia

References

Rivers of Randolph County, West Virginia
Rivers of West Virginia